On the Radio: Greatest Hits Volumes I & II is the first greatest hits album by American singer Donna Summer, released on October 15, 1979. It was her fourth consecutive double album, and also made her the first person ever to take three consecutive double albums to the number one spot on the U.S. album chart. This would become Summer's third multi-platinum album to date.

Background and production
In the early stages of Summer's recording career, her work had been distributed in different countries by different record labels. Varying compilations had been released by these labels. In 1977, Casablanca Records (who had previously been responsible for distributing her work in the U.S.) became responsible for distributing her music in most nations and On the Radio became the first proper international compilation album released by them after years of many successful disco hits. (NB: There were still some countries, such as The Netherlands where other labels continued to distribute her work. A similar compilation was released by Philips Records in this country). The album spanned Summer's career from her breakthrough, the raunchy "Love to Love You Baby" right through to the more rock-influenced tracks of her Bad Girls album. The majority of the tracks were either remixed or edited, largely to fit such a big number of tracks onto two records. Each side, barring side D, runs as a continuous mix.

The compilation also contained two brand-new tracks. The first of these was the pop–disco flavored "On the Radio" (which opened the album, and closed it in a longer version). Written for the film Foxes, this song was reminiscent of some of her other hits ("Last Dance", "MacArthur Park", "Dim All the Lights") in that it started off with a slow beat. The longer version at the end of the album, like the full-length version of "Last Dance", also contained a slow part in the middle. The song was nominated for a Grammy in the Best Female Pop Vocal Performance category. A longer version was used on the Foxes movie soundtrack release, but omits the final "...now I'm sittin' here with the man I sent away long ago" verse, opting for a repeat of the third instead.

The second new track was a duet with Barbra Streisand entitled "No More Tears (Enough Is Enough)". Like "On the Radio", it also had a slow beginning but evolved into a disco number. An early example of girl power, the song was released as a 12" Disco single (with provocative cover – black-and-white photo of Summer and Streisand in merry widow bustiers, Streisand's favorite font used for the titles) towards the end of 1979 and hit the Number One spot on the American singles chart (making it Summer's fourth chart-topper there). It was also a big international hit, making Number Three in the U.K. At the beginning of 1980, the shorter version of "On the Radio" was also released as a single, and became Summer's ninth Top 5 on the U.S. singles chart.

On the Radio proved to be Summer's final release with Casablanca Records. She had not been happy for some time with the label's treatment of her – she felt exploited and that she was being made to portray a sexual image with which she was not comfortable. At one point this had driven her to depression and suicide attempts. However, by 1979 she had become a born-again Christian and rediscovered herself. She remained with the label for her Bad Girls and On the Radio albums, and then signed a deal with Geffen Records in 1980. The song "On The Radio" was nominated for "Best Pop Vocal Female" at the Grammy Awards.

In some territories, such as France, the compilation was also marketed (for a limited time) as two separate discs, Greatest Hits Volume 1 and Greatest Hits Volume 2, with the same track listing as each individual disc in the original double LP.  Both sleeves used the identical photo, showing Summer literally 'on the radio', as the front cover of the original double LP, but reduced in size; the former against a silver background and the latter against a gold background.

Critical reception

The album received acclaim by music critics. Andy Kellman from AllMusic website gave the album four and a half stars out of five and wrote that the album  "is an almost complete anthology of her popular '70s output". Robert Christgau gave the album an "A" and wrote that "despite the repeat of the title tune", "the overlap with Bad Girls", and the "inevitable 'MacArthur Park'" the album "proves that whatever the virtues of her disco extensions, she makes like a rock and roller at AM size." Eric Henderson from Slant Magazine gave the album four and a half stars out of five and wrote that the album "is perhaps the most well-timed greatest hits package ever" and that "it's also a testament to Summer's undeniable fascination with the changing tides of popular music". He also said that "until Madonna's The Immaculate Collection, one could scarcely imagine a more compelling argument on behalf of the artistic merit of quintessentially singles artists."

Commercial performance
Despite being a double album, a number of Summer's Billboard Hot 100 hits were left off On the Radio; "Could It Be Magic" from A Love Trilogy, "Spring Affair" and "Winter Melody" from Four Seasons of Love, and "Rumour Has It" from Once Upon a Time.  Furthermore, two songs from I Remember Yesterday were omitted; the top 20 R&B hit "Can't We Just Sit Down (And Talk It Over)" and the UK Top 5 single "Love's Unkind", as was "The Hostage", a top ten European hit from Summer's debut album, Lady of the Night.

Following Summer's death in 2012, the album re-entered the Billboard 200 at number 73.

Track listing
All tracks produced by Giorgio Moroder and Pete Bellotte except "On the Radio" and "On the Radio (long version)" by Moroder, and "No More Tears (Enough Is Enough)" by Gary Klein and Moroder.

Charts and certifications

Weekly charts

Year-end charts

Certifications and sales

References

Albums produced by Giorgio Moroder
Albums produced by Pete Bellotte
1979 compilation albums
Donna Summer compilation albums
Casablanca Records compilation albums